Royal Consort Suk-ui of the Sangsan Kim clan (Hangul: 숙의 김씨, Hanja: 淑儀 金氏; 1440 - 1525) was a Joseon royal consort of Danjong of Joseon.

Life 
Lady Kim was born into the Sangsan Kim clan in 1440 as the daughter of Kim Sa-woo and Lady Yi of the Gwangju Yi clan.

In 1454, she entered Changdeok Palace along with Lady Song of the Yeosan Song clan, Song Hyeon-Su's daughter, and Lady Kwon of the Andong Kwon clan, Kwon Wan's daughter, for the consort process. It was then decided that Lady Song, the future Queen Jeongsun, would become the King's Queen Consort, and Lady Kwon and Lady Kim would become concubines.

Afterwards, she lived in the house of Prince Milseong, the illegitimate son of King Sejong, and entered the palace together on January 24 of the lunar calendar when Queen Jeongsun was appointed. At some point, Suk-ui Kim fell ill after entering the palace, and Danjong moved her residence to the residence of his uncle, Grand Prince Suyang.

Grand Prince Suyang eventually led a coup de’tat against his nephew, and took over the throne. Danjong later died in 1457 by order of execution.

Even after King Danjong's abdication, Lady Kim and her father were in a better condition than Queen Jeongsun and her father.

Lady Kim's father, Kim Sa-woo, continued to hold government posts and was in charge of the military. Accordingly, several ministers wanted to impeach Kim Sa-woo, but King Sejo did not permit the impeachment because Kim Sa-woo was a public servant. Afterwards, Kim Sa-woo, unlike Song Hyeon-su and Kwon Wan, who were executed while trying to restore King Danjong, served various government posts and died in 1464 during the 10th year of King Sejo.

On the other hand, Lady Kim seemed to have lived in Seoul all the way after the death of King Danjong. In 1519, the 14th year of King Jungjong, on January 26 of the lunar calendar, she survived over 80 years of age and began to pay tribute to the country. At that time, using the example of the fact that the Lady Kim paid her taxes for every year while she was alive in Yejo, he inquired about her wealth. She did not have any wealth because she was a concubine whose husband died.

On the other hand, because Lady Kim did not resuscitate and did not have any children with the deceased king, she was permitted to adopt a male relative from her maternal clan, Yi Yak-bing of the Gwangju Yi clan. Lady Kim later died in 1525 at the age of 85, and is buried in Chungju, Chungcheong Province.

Family 
 Father - Kim Sa-woo (김사우, 金師禹) (1415 - 1464)
 Mother - Lady Yi of the Gwangju Yi clan (광주 이씨, 廣州 李氏)
 Grandfather - Yi In-son (이인손,李仁孫; 1395 - 1463)
 Grandmother - Lady No (노씨, 盧氏); daughter No Shin (노신, 盧信)
 Uncle - Yi Geuk-bae (영의정 이극배, 李克培) (1422 - 1495); Yeonguijeong
 Aunt - Lady Choi (최씨, 崔氏); daughter of Choi Yu-jung (최유종, 崔有悰)
 Cousin - Yi Se-chong (이세충, 李世忠)
 Cousin - Yi Se-pil (이세필, 李世弼) (? - 1488)
 Cousin - Yi Se-gwang (이세광, 李世匡)
 Cousin - Yi Se-ju (이세주, 李世柱)
 Cousin - Lady Yi of the Gwangju Yi clan (광주 이씨, 廣州 李氏); married Hong Hyo-son (홍효손, 洪孝孫)
 Cousin - Lady Yi of the Gwangju Yi clan (광주 이씨, 廣州 李氏); married Nam Jeong (남정, 南禎)
 Cousin - Lady Yi of the Gwangju Yi clan (광주 이씨, 廣州 李氏); married Jeong Hae (정해, 鄭澥)
 Uncle - Yi Geuk-gam (이극감, 李克堪) (1427 - 28 July 1465)
 Cousin - Yi Se-jwa (이세좌) 
 Cousin - Yi Se-woo (이세우, 李世佑)
 Cousin - Yi Se-geol (이세걸, 李世傑)
 Uncle - Yi Geuk-don (이극돈, 李克墩) (1435 - 27 February 1503)
 Aunt - Lady Kwon of the Andong Kwon clan (안동 권씨, 安東 權氏)
 Cousin - Yi Se-jeon (이세전, 李世銓) 
 Cousin - Yi Se-gyeong (이세경, 李世銓)
 Cousin - Yi Se-jeong (이세정, 李世貞) (1461 - 1529)
 Cousin - Lady Yi of the Gwangju Yi clan (광주 이씨, 廣州 李氏) (1470 - 1553); married Song Su of the Yeosan Song clan (송수, 宋壽; 1470 - September 1517)
 Uncle - Yi Geuk-gyun (이극균, 李克均) (1437 - 1504)
 Aunt - Lady Yi (이씨, 李氏); daughter of Yi Cheol-geun (이철근, 李鐵根)
 Husband - Yi Hong-wi, Danjong of Joseon (조선 단종) (9 September 1441 - 7 November 1457)
 Father-in-law - Munjong of Joseon (조선 문종) (15 November 1414 – 1 June 1452) 
 Mother-in-law - Queen Hyeondeok of the Andong Kwon clan (현덕왕후 권씨) (17 April 1418 – 10 August 1441) 
 Issue
 Adoptive son - Yi Yak-bing (이약빙, 李若氷) (1489 - 1547)

References

Royal consorts of the Joseon dynasty
1440 births
1525 deaths
15th-century Korean women
15th-century Korean people
16th-century Korean people
16th-century Korean women